Pseudagrion hamoni, the swarthy sprite, is a species of damselfly in the family Coenagrionidae.

Distribution and status
This sprite has a pan-African distribution, and is also found in Yemen and Saudi Arabia. The species currently has no major global threats. Populations in some desert localities in North Africa are isolated from more secure populations further south.

Habitat
Its natural habitats include ponds, streams and rivers in savanna and bush. In the arid northern parts of its range, it is found in wadis and gueltas.

Gallery

References

External links

 Pseudagrion hamoni on African Dragonflies and Damselflies Online

Coenagrionidae
Insects described in 1955
Taxonomy articles created by Polbot